Looking at You is the fourth solo studio album by the English singer and multi-instrumentalist Chaz Jankel. It was originally released in 1985, on the label A&M. It was his last solo album until 2001's Out of the Blue, as well as his last to be released on A&M, after Jerry Moss, the recording executive of A&M, rejected the release of his fifth album and terminated his recording career with the label in the same year.

The album featured some lyrical contributions from Ian Dury and musical contributions from two of the Blockheads, bass player Norman Watt-Roy and drummer Charlie Charles.

The track "Number One" was featured in the 1985 movie Real Genius starring Val Kilmer.

Track listing

Personnel
Credits are adapted from the album's liner notes.

Chaz Jankel – lead vocals; guitar; keyboards; drum machine programming; percussion
Robbie Taylor – keyboards; drum machine programming
Charlie Charles – drums; additional percussion
Norman Watt-Roy – bass guitar
Zeus B. Held – Fairlight CMI programming
Steve Rance – Fairlight CMI programming
Paul Samuelson – Fairlight CMI programming
Derek Watkins – trumpet; horn arrangements
Caroline Lavelle – cello; string arrangements
Peter Van Hooke – Simmons tom fills
Jeff Daly – saxophone
Andy Macintosh – saxophone
Tim Sanders – saxophone
Johnny Rees – violin
Liz Layton – violin
Andy Brown – viola
Martin Ditcham – Latin percussion
Chris Taylor – Latin percussion
Geraldo – Latin percussion
Tessa Niles – backing vocals
Kenny Young – backing vocals
Germaine Johnson – backing vocals
Terry Roberts – backing vocals

Production team
Zeus B. Held – producer
Philip Bagenal – producer; engineer; editing
Chaz Jankel – producer 
Keiron De Lancey-Wheeler – assistant engineer
Bob Carbone – mastering
Aaron Chuckraverty – mastering
Michael Ross – art direction
Richard Haughton – photography
Helen Backhouse – design
Jeremy Williams – design

See also
 List of albums released in 1985

References

External links

1985 albums
A&M Records albums
Chaz Jankel albums